The 7th European Cross Country Championships were held at Malmö in Sweden on 10 December 2000. Paulo Guerra took his fourth title in the men's competition and Katalin Szentgyörgyi won the women's race.

Results

Men individual 9.71 km

Men teams

Women individual 4.95 km

Women teams

Junior men individual 6.14 km

Junior men teams

Junior women individual 3.76 km

Junior women teams

References

External links 
 Database containing all results between 1994–2007

European Cross Country Championships
European Cross Country Championships
2000 in Swedish sport
International athletics competitions hosted by Sweden
Cross country running in Sweden
December 2000 sports events in Europe
International sports competitions in Malmö
2000s in Malmö